Ningguo is a county-level city in the southeast of Anhui province, People's Republic of China, under the administration of Xuancheng City and bordering Zhejiang province to the south and east.

Ningguo has jurisdiction over eleven towns, seventeen townships, and one ethnic township.

History 

The name Ningguo is named from "Yi-QianGau" . It is written, "".
Ningguo was founded in 208 CE during the Eastern Han dynasty. Sun Quan divided the southern part of Wanling County into Ningguo and Huaian County.

On April 23, 1949, Ningguo County was occupied by the People's Liberation Army, and in May it was assigned to Xuancheng Prefecture. It became part of Huizhou Prefecture in January 1952, Wuhu Prefecture in February 1956, Huizhou Prefecture again in March 1961, and finally Xuancheng Prefecture in January 1980.

Administrative divisions
Ningguo City is divided to 6 Subdistricts, 8 towns and 5 townships.
Subdistricts

Towns

Townships

Climate

Transportation

Rail
Ningguo is served by the Anhui–Jiangxi Railway.

References

Cities in Anhui
Xuancheng